HMS Raider is an  patrol and training vessel of the British Royal Navy.

Characteristics
Raider is one of sixteen , 54-tonne P2000 patrol craft operated by the Royal Navy. She is constructed from glass-reinforced plastic. Both Raider and  operate in the force protection role, providing maritime security for high value shipping in the Firth of Clyde, and are armed with three general purpose machine guns.

Service
Raider, formerly of Cambridge URNU, became Bristol URNU's training ship in Summer 2010, superseding .  In October 2012 she joined the Faslane Patrol Boat Squadron to replace , which returned to Bristol URNU.

References

External links

 

Archer-class patrol vessels
1988 ships